Gregorys Coffee is a New York-based  coffee roaster and retailer. Aside from a range of coffee and tea choices, Gregorys Coffee also offers pastries, packaged foods, and a plant-based meal selection curated by an in-house registered dietitian that are prepared from scratch daily.

The company logo is designed to look like its founder, with two mugs for glasses and a full head of wavy-hair. 



History
Gregorys Coffee was founded by Gregory Zamfotis in 2006, with its first location on Park Avenue and 24th Street in Manhattan. The company is a part of the third wave coffee or specialty coffee industry. The company's preferred brew method is the aeropress. The company opened their 24th shop in 2017.

Locations
The company currently has cafés in Manhattan, New Jersey, Brooklyn, and Washington, D.C.

In September 2016, Gregorys opened a roastery and commissary in Long Island City, Queens, New York. Later that year opened its first location outside of Manhattan, located on the Jersey City waterfront.

In 2016, the company signed a 15-year lease at 16 Court Street, Brooklyn. This is the first in the borough.

In 2017, Gregorys opened several coffee shops in Washington, D.C.

In March 2020, Gregorys temporarily closed all 31 of their shops due to the coronavirus pandemic.

See also
 Intelligentsia Coffee & Tea
 La Colombe Coffee Roasters
 Counter Culture Coffee
 Stumptown Coffee

References

Coffeehouses and cafés in the United States
Coffee brands
Companies based in New York City